1993 United Kingdom budget may refer to:

 March 1993 United Kingdom budget, held on 16 March 1993
 November 1993 United Kingdom budget, held on 30 November